The 2010–11 season was the ninth season in FC Vaslui's existence, and its sixth in a row in Liga I. Having finished third last season, FC Vaslui is qualified for the play-off round in Europa League.

First-team squad

 T=Total
 L=Liga I
 C=Cupa României
 I=UEFA Europa League, Intertoto UEFA Cup

Transfers

Summer

In

Out

Winter

Out

Statistics

Appearances and goals
Last updated on 21 May 2011.

|-
|colspan="12"|Players sold or loaned out during the season
|-

|}

Top scorers

Disciplinary record

Overall

{|class="wikitable"
|-
|Games played || 37 (34 Liga I, 2 UEFA Europa League, 1 Cupa României)
|-
|Games won || 18 (18 Liga I)
|-
|Games drawn ||  13 (11 Liga I, 1 UEFA Europa League, 1 Cupa României)
|-
|Games lost || 6 (5 Liga I, 1 UEFA Europa League)
|-
|Goals scored || 51
|-
|Goals conceded || 30
|-
|Goal difference || +21
|-
|Yellow cards || 85
|-
|Red cards || 6
|-
|Worst discipline ||  Lucian Sânmărtean with 7 yellow cards and 2 red cards
|-
|Best result || 4–0 (H) v Oţelul Galaţi – Liga I – 13 Sep 2010
|-
|Worst result || 0–3 (H) v Steaua – Liga I – 22 Aug 2010
|-
|Most appearances ||  Wesley with 35 appearances
|-
|Top scorer ||  Wesley (14 goals)
|-
|Points || 65/102 (63.7%)
|-

Performances
Updated to games played on 21 May 2011.

Goal minutes
Updated to games played on 21 May 2011.

Liga I

League table

Results summary

Results by round

Matches

Liga I

UEFA Europa League

Play-off

Cupa României

References

2010-11
Romanian football clubs 2010–11 season